Chavarzaq District is in Tarom County, Zanjan province, Iran. At the 2006 National Census, its population was 17,655 in 4,346 households. The following census in 2011 counted 18,920 people in 5,284 households. At the latest census in 2016, the district had 18,803 inhabitants in 5,744 households.

References 

Tarom County

Districts of Zanjan Province

Populated places in Zanjan Province

Populated places in Tarom County